Admiral Patterson may refer to:

Julian Patterson (1884–1972), British Royal Navy rear admiral
Thomas H. Patterson (1820–1889), U.S. Navy rear admiral
Wilfrid Patterson (1893–1954), British Royal Navy admiral